Tanzania competed at the 1992 Summer Olympics in Barcelona, Spain.

Competitors
The following is the list of number of competitors in the Games.

Athletics

Men
Track & road events

Boxing

Men

References

Sources
Official Olympic Reports
sports-reference

See also
Tanzania at the 1990 Commonwealth Games
Tanzania at the 1994 Commonwealth Games

Nations at the 1992 Summer Olympics
1992
Olympics